Marjorie Basden High School is a secondary school in South Caicos, Turks and Caicos.

It was previously named Pierson High School and received its current name in 1990, after Marjorie Lightbourne-Basden, a former teacher who retired in 1980. Rodney Cox became the principal in 2018; Cox began working for the school circa 1992 as a teacher and rose through the ranks.

References

External links
 Marjorie Basden High School at Facebook

Secondary schools in British Overseas Territories
Schools in the Turks and Caicos Islands